Jagged Island is a rocky island  north-northwest of Round Point, King George Island, in the South Shetland Islands. Presumably known to early sealers in the area, it was charted by Discovery Investigations personnel on the Discovery II in 1935 and given this descriptive name.

See also 
 List of antarctic and sub-antarctic islands

References

Islands of King George Island (South Shetland Islands)